Byblis gigantea, commonly known as rainbow plant, is a carnivorous species of plant in the Byblidaceae family. It is endemic to Australia.

Description
It is a tall leafy plant with the leaf bases closely spaced. It has deep, woody perennial rootstock that the plant is able to resprout from the rhizomes after fire. It blooms between September and January producing pink-purple and white flowers. It has three nerved sepals and forms an obtuse subglobose shaped capsule with many faint nerves. The seeds have highly corrugated and ribbed sculptured plates.

Taxonomy
The species was first formally described by the botanist John Lindley in 1839 as part of the work A Sketch of the Vegetation of the Swan River Colony. The only known synonym is Byblis lindleyana as described by Jules Émile Planchon in 1848.

The type specimen was collected by James Drummond in 1839 from around the Swan River. The specific epithet is taken from the Latin word giganteus meaning giant referring to the larger size of this species compared to Byblis liniflora.

B. gigantea is closely related to Byblis lamellata but they have different seed morphology.

Distribution
It has a scattered distribution from the Wheatbelt region around Dandaragan in the north down through the suburbs of Perth, Western Australia on the Swan Coastal Plain and into the Darling Range then south as far as Boddington in the Peel region. The plant is often found in and around swamps and seasonally wet areas growing in sandy peaty soils and is usually part of low Leptospermum and Restionaceae dominated shrubland communities.

Conservation status
The species was listed a Critically Endangered on the International Union for Conservation of Nature red list in 2000.

In 2002 the species was listed as a "Priority Two" flora, mostly as a result of it being absent over much of its former range due to urban expansion throughout the Perth metropolitan area.

Cultivation
B. gigantea prefers drier conditions than most sundews. It grows well in large pots containing a very sandy soil mix and is top-watered only. These plants are prone to fungal death until they become established. To germinate the seeds for this plant gibberellic acid treatment or pot fire treatment may be required. The age of the seeds is not important, seeds over 22 years of age have germinated after fire treatment.

References

gigantea
Critically endangered flora of Australia
Eudicots of Western Australia
Taxonomy articles created by Polbot
Plants described in 1839